La Mejor Música de los Andes Venezolanos is a 33 rpm LP album by Venezuelan composer/arranger/conductor Aldemaro Romero, released in 1961 by the record label Cymbal.

Aldemaro Romero presents at this album popular pieces from the Venezuelan Andes, upgrading this waltzes and bambucos from its folk instrumentations to full modern orchestral versions, at the celebration of the 400th anniversary of San Cristóbal city.

Track listing

References 
Information and track listing from the album La Mejor Música de los Andes Venezolanos.

1961 albums
Aldemaro Romero albums
Albums produced by Aldemaro Romero